{{Taxobox
| name = Naseus
| image = Acanthuridae - Naseus rectifrons.JPG
| image_width = 250px
| image_caption = Fossil of Naseus rectifrons from Monte Bolca (Italy)
| fossil_range = 
| regnum = Animalia
| phylum = Chordata
| classis = Actinopterygii
| ordo = Acanthuriformes
| subordo = Acanthuroidei
| familia = Acanthuridae
| genus = Naseus|genus_authority = Agassiz 1842
}}Naseus is an extinct genus of surgeonfishes from the Lutetian-aged Monte Bolca Lagerstätte.

Species
Species within this genus include:

 Naseus nuchalis  Agassiz 1842
 Naseus rectifrons''  Agassiz 1842

References

 
Prehistoric ray-finned fish genera